The 1981 Lafayette Leopards football team was an American football team that represented Lafayette College as an independent during the 1981 NCAA Division I-AA football season.

In their first year under head coach Bill Russo, the Leopards compiled a 9–2 record. Steve Biale and Joe Skladany were the team captains.

Lafayette played its home games at Fisher Field on College Hill in Easton, Pennsylvania.

Schedule

References

Lafayette
Lafayette Leopards football seasons
Lafayette Leopards football